Lucius Aemilius Barbula (fl. 281-280 BC), or Lucius Aemilius Q.f. Q.n. Barbula, was a Roman politician and general from the patrician gens Aemilia. He was elected consul for 281 BC and was given a command against the Samnites. He invaded the territory of Tarentum, which summoned Pyrrhus of Epirus for help.  In 280, he was awarded a triumph for his victories in Tarentum, Samnium, and elsewhere.

Barbula was son of Quintus Aemilius Barbula, consul of 317 and 311, and grandson of another Quintus. His son Marcus Aemilius L.n. Q.f. Barbula became consul in 230, the third and last successive generations of consuls from this branch.

References

Sources
Smith, William. "BARBULA: 2. L. Aemilius Barbula" Dictionary of Greek and Roman Biography and Mythology (1870), online version. v. 1, page 461-462
T. Robert S. Broughton: The Magistrates Of The Roman Republic. Vol. 1: 509 B.C. - 100 B.C.. Cleveland / Ohio: Case Western Reserve University Press, 1951. Reprint 1968. (Philological Monographs. Edited by the American Philological Association. Vol. 15, 1)

3rd-century BC Roman consuls
Barbula, Lucius

Pyrrhic War